This timeline is a chronology of significant events in the history of the U.S. State of Colorado and the historical area now occupied by the state.


Timeline

2020s

2010s

2000s

1990s

1980s

1970s

1960s

1950s

1940s

1930s

1920s

1910s

1900s

1890s

1880s

1870s

1860s

1850s

1840s

1830s

1820s

1810s

1800s

1790s

1780s

1770s

1760s

1730s

1690s

1680s

1590s

1540s

1520s

1510s

1490s

Before 1492

See also

State of Colorado
Government of Colorado
Governor of Colorado
History of Colorado
List of territorial claims and designations in Colorado
Territory of Colorado
Timeline of Aurora, Colorado
Timeline of Boulder, Colorado
Timeline of Colorado Springs, Colorado
Timeline of Denver
Timeline of mining in Colorado
Timeline of women's suffrage in Colorado
Prehistory of Colorado
Outline of Colorado prehistory
Southwestern archaeology
Paleontology in Colorado
Indigenous peoples of the North American Southwest

Notes

References
References are included in the linked articles.

External links

State of Colorado website
History Colorado website

Timeline
Timeline
Timelines of states of the United States
United States history timelines